Niedere Börde is a municipality in the Börde district in Saxony-Anhalt, Germany. It is situated between Haldensleben and Magdeburg. It was formed in January 2004 by the merger of the former municipalities Dahlenwarsleben, Groß Ammensleben, Gutenswegen, Jersleben, Klein Ammensleben, Meseberg, Samswegen and Vahldorf.

References

Börde (district)